Stok Lacki  is a village in the administrative district of Gmina Siedlce, within Siedlce County, Masovian Voivodeship, in east-central Poland.

The village has a population of 721.

References

Stok Lacki